Rogen may refer to:

 Rogen, lake on the border of Sweden and Norway

People with the name
 Rogen Ladon (born 1993), Filipino amateur boxer
 Lauren Miller Rogen (born 1982), American actress, screenwriter, and director
 Seth Rogen (born 1982), Canadian-American actor, comedian, and filmmaker

See also 
 Rogan, surname
 Rogin, surname